This is a list of episodes for Tokusou Sentai Dekaranger, the twenty-eighth incarnation of the long running Super Sentai series produced by Toei Company. The episode titles only contain katakana, as they are read in English.

Episode list

References

External links
 Tokusou Sentai Dekaranger at TV Asahi
 Tokusou Sentai Dekaranger at Toei Company
 Tokusou Sentai Dekaranger at Super-Sentai.net

Super Sentai episodes